The Krapanski Potok is a tributary to the Raša in Istria, Croatia.

It originates close to the town of Raša, flows roughly south and flows into the Raša close to the village Most Raša.

Rivers of Croatia
Landforms of Istria County
1Krapanski Potok